The year 1730 in music involved some significant events.

Events
The Beggar's Opera by John Gay is so popular that a deck of playing cards based on the characters is printed.
Antonio Vivaldi and his family arrive in Prague.
André Campra becomes Inspector General of the Paris Opera.
April 7 Johann Sebastian Bach premieres his copy of the anonymous St Luke Passion BWV 246 (BC D 6) at St. Nicholas Church, Leipzig.]

Published music
George Frideric Handel – Sonates pour un Traversiere un Violon ou Hautbois Con Basso Continuo Composées par G. F. Handel (Amsterdam: Jeanne Roger), actually a forgery by John Walsh in London—Jeanne Roger had died in 1722

Classical music
Johann Sebastian Bach 
Jauchzet Gott in allen Landen, BWV 51
Nun danket alle Gott, BWV 192
Lukaspassion, BWV 246 (now attributed to Johann Melchior Molter)
Organ Sonata No. 1 in E-flat major, BWV 525
Organ Sonata No. 3 in D minor, BWV 527
Organ Sonata No. 6 in G major, BWV 530
Partita in E minor, BWV 830
Violin Sonata in G major, BWV 1021
3 Sonatas for Viola da Gamba and Harpsichord, BWV 1027-1029
Violin Concerto in A minor, BWV 1041
Concerto for 2 Harpsichords in C minor, BWV 1060
 Francesco Barsanti – 9 Overtures, Op. 4
Joseph Bodin de Boismortier 
6 Suites and 2 Sonatas, Op. 27
6 Sonates en trio suivies de concertos, Op. 28
Diverses pièces de viole avec la basse chiffrée, Op. 31
Antonio Caldara – La Passione di Gesù Cristo
François Couperin – Pièces de clavecin, book 4
Philippe Courbois – Recueil d'airs sérieux et à boire à une et deux voix
Carl Heinrich Graun
Ein Lämmlein geht und trägt die Schuld (Passion cantata)
Kommt her und schauet (Passion oratorio)
 George Frideric Handel 
 Allegro in D minor, HWV 475
 Leo Leonardo – 14 Toccate
Benedetto Marcello – Requiem "In the Venetian Manner"
Johan Helmich Roman – Assaggio in G minor, BeRI 314 and 320
Thomas Roseingrave – XII Solos
Georg Philipp Telemann 
Fast allgemeines Evangelisch-Musicalisches Lieder-Buch
Matthäus-Passion, TWV 5:15
Nouvelles sonatines
6 Quadri a violino, flauto traversiere, viola da gamba o violoncello, e fondamento: ripartiti in 2. concerti, 2. balletti, 2. suonate, Hamburg: [Telemann] ("Paris Quartets" Nos. 1–6), TWV 43:G1, 43:D1, 43:A1, 43:g1, 43:e1, 43:h1
Violin Concerto, TWV 51:G8
 Johann Theile – Ach dass ich hören sollte
 Antonio Vivaldi 
 Trio Sonata in C major, RV 82
 Chamber Concerto in D major, RV 93
 Violin Concerto in D major, RV 206
 Bassoon Concerto in C major, RV 473
 Bassoon Concerto in C major, RV 477
 Bassoon Concerto in A minor, RV 500
 Concerto in G major, RV 575
 Fonti di pianto piangete, RV 656
 Par che tardo oltre il costume, RV 662
 Qual per ignoto calle, RV 677
Jan Dismas ZelenkaI penitenti al sepolcro del redentore, ZWV 63Haec dies quam fecit Dominus, ZWV 169

Opera
Francesco Araia – BereniceRiccardo Broschi – IdaspeAntonio Caldara – EnoneGiovanni Battista Costanzi – L'EupatraFrancesco Feo – AndromacaGeorge Frideric Handel – Partenope, HWV 27
Johann Adolf HasseArminioArtaserseDalisaNicola Antonio Porpora – MitridateJoseph-Nicolas-Pancrace Royer – PyrrhusLeonardo Vinci Alessandro nell'Indie, premiered Jan. 2 in RomeArtaserseAntonio Vivaldi – ArgippoBirths
February 23 – Cristiano Giuseppe Lidarti, composer (died c. 1793)
April 21 – Antonin Kammel, composer (died 1788)
May 29 – William Jackson, organist (died 1803)
June 14 – Antonio Sacchini, opera composer (died 1786)
September 7 – Elisabetta de Gambarini, composer (died 1765) 
December 14 – Capel Bond, organist and composer (died 1790)date unknownTheodore Aylward Sr., organist (died 1801)
Pasquale Errichelli, organist and composer (died 1785)
Domenico Gallo, violinist and composer (died c. 1768)

Deaths
March 17 – Antonín Reichenauer, composer (born c.1694)
March 22 – Benedetto Pamphili, Italian cardinal, patron of the arts, composer and librettist (born 1653)
April 10 – Sébastien de Brossard, music theorist (born 1655)
May 27 – Leonardo Vinci, composer (born 1690)
June 19 – Jean-Baptiste Loeillet of London (born 1680)
August 31 – Gottfried Finger, composer (born c. 1655)
October 15 – Jean Baptiste Senaillé, virtuoso violinist and composer (born 1687)date unknownWilliam Hine, organist and composer (born 1687)
Carlo Annibale Tononi, luthier (born 1675)probableFilippo Amadei, composer
Charles Piroye, composer (born c.1670)

References

Sources
 Pitou, Spire (1983). The Paris Opéra: an encyclopedia of operas, ballets, composers, and performers (3 volumes). Westport, Connecticut: Greenwood Press. .
 Sadie, Stanley, editor (1992). The new Grove dictionary of opera'' (4 volumes). London: Macmillan. .

 
18th century in music
Music by year